The 2017–18 season was 8th season in the top Ukrainian football league for Zirka Kropyvnytskyi. Zirka competed in Premier League and Ukrainian Cup. After finishing at 10th place in Premier league, Zirka lost to Desna Chernihiv in play-offs and was relegated to First League.

Players

Squad information

Transfers

In

Out

Pre-season and friendlies

Competitions

Overall

Premier League

League table

Results summary

Results by round

Matches

Relegation round

Ukrainian Cup

Statistics

Appearances and goals

|-
! colspan=14 style=background:#dcdcdc; text-align:center| Goalkeepers

|-
! colspan=14 style=background:#dcdcdc; text-align:center| Defenders

|-
! colspan=14 style=background:#dcdcdc; text-align:center| Midfielders 

|-
! colspan=14 style=background:#dcdcdc; text-align:center| Forwards

|-
! colspan=14 style=background:#dcdcdc; text-align:center| Players transferred out during the season

Last updated: 27 May 2018

Goalscorers

Last updated: 27 May 2018

Clean sheets

Last updated: 27 May 2018

Disciplinary record

Last updated: 27 May 2018

References

External links 
 Official Club website

FC Zirka Kropyvnytskyi
Zirka Kropyvnytskyi